Groși is a commune in Maramureș County, Romania. It is composed of three villages: Groși, Ocoliș (Feketefalu), and Satu Nou de Jos (Alsóújfalu).

The commune lies on the banks of the Lăpuș River. It is located in the western part of the county, just south of the county seat, Baia Mare. Groși is crossed by national road , which runs from Cășeiu,  to the south, to Baia Mare,  to the north.

At the 2011 census, the commune had a population of 3,283 people, of which 94.71% were Romanians and 1.51% Hungarians.

Natives
 Dumitru Fărcaș (1938–2018), taragot player.

References

Communes in Maramureș County